Monjar Mui (also Romanized as Monjar Mū’ī; also known as Mūnjar Mū’ī) is a village in Rig Rural District of the Central District of Lordegan County, Chaharmahal and Bakhtiari province, Iran. At the 2006 census, its population was 2,460 in 463 households. The following census in 2011 counted 2,671 people in 604 households. The latest census in 2016 showed a population of 2,778 people in 703 households; it was the largest village in its rural district.

References 

Lordegan County

Populated places in Chaharmahal and Bakhtiari Province

Populated places in Lordegan County